Lal Prasad Sawa Limbu is a Nepali politician and a member of the House of Representatives of the federal parliament of Nepal. This is the first time he has been elected to parliament. He was elected from Jhapa-4 constituency under the first-past-the-post system representing CPN UML of the left alliance. He received 43,515 votes. He defeated his nearest rival Deuman Thebe of Nepali Congress who received 26,822 votes.

References

Living people
Communist Party of Nepal (Unified Marxist–Leninist) politicians
Nepal Communist Party (NCP) politicians
Nepal MPs 2017–2022
1967 births
Nepal MPs 2022–present